Paul Fung Jr. (March 9, 1923 – April 8, 2016) was an American cartoonist who drew the Blondie comic book for 40 years. He was the son of Paul Fung, a cartoonist who drew the comic strip Dumb Dora for several years. He has two children, Paul (Randy) Fung III and Lori Fung. Both still reside in Greenwich.

Comic strip
He was Chic Young's assistant on the Blondie newspaper strip from 1949 until 1965.

Comic book
Fung Jr. also contributed to the Blondie comic book with his Flash Foley, News Photographer stories.

He was the son of Paul Fung, a cartoonist who drew the comic strip Dumb Dora for several years and had worked with Cliff Sterrett and Billy DeBeck. The elder Fung took over Dumb Dora when Chic Young left that strip.

Awards
In 1964, Fung Jr. received the National Cartoonists Society's Comic Book Award for his work, and 16 years later, he won their Best Humorist Award.

References

External links
NCS Awards
NCS: Paul Fung
NCS

1923 births
2016 deaths
Artists from Seattle
American comics artists
American comic strip cartoonists
American people of Chinese descent